Alopecosa taeniopus is a wolf spider species in the genus Alopecosa found from "Greece to China".

See also  
 List of Lycosidae species

References 

taeniopus
Spiders of Europe
Spiders of Asia
Spiders described in 1895